The Women's 15 kilometre skiathlon competition at the FIS Nordic World Ski Championships 2023 was held on 25 February 2023.

Results
The race was started at 14:00.

References

Women's 15 kilometre skiathlon